Leah-Marie Ramalho (born 14 April 1992) is a Canadian-born Guyanese footballer who plays as a defender. She has been a member of the Guyana women's national team.

Early life
Ramalho hails from Brampton, Ontario. She attended the Cardinal Leger Secondary School from 2007 to 2010.

International career
Ramalho qualified to play for Guyana through her father. She represented the Lady Jags at the 2012 CONCACAF Women's U-20 Championship qualifying. At senior level, she capped during the 2016 CONCACAF Women's Olympic Qualifying Championship.

See also
List of Guyana women's international footballers

References

1992 births
Living people
Citizens of Guyana through descent
Guyanese women's footballers
Women's association football defenders
Guyana women's international footballers
Soccer players from Brampton
Laurentian Voyageurs players
Canadian sportspeople of Guyanese descent